Transtorno do Espectro Autista e Acessibilidade Amorosa is a paper written by the authors Sophia Mendonça and Sônia Caldas Pessoa. The work was publishedin the third volume of the collection Caminhos da Aprendizagem e Inclusão: Entretecendo Múltiplos Saberes (2021).

Summary 
Transtorno do Espectro Autista e Acessibilidade Amorosa brings together a series of real and fictional testimonies of autistic characters and dialogues to reflect on the love relationships of people with Autistic Spectrum Disorder. The paper's mais focus is loving accessibility, a concept proposed by researchers Sônia Caldas Pessoa and Mariana Cecilia da Silva, both from the Federal University of Minas Gerais.

The loving acessibility idea is based on the notion of affective accessibility, which was developed by Pessoa so that communicational relationships between people with and without disabilities would be encounters in which the condition would not imply an impediment for this conversation to take place. Thus, the only barrier that would exist in these relationships would be the agreements between the people involved;;In turn, loving accessibility expands this concept to the possibility for people with disabilities to arouse interest and attraction in other individuals. In this way, based on interest, there would be an exchange and a relationship.

So, in Transtorno do Espectro Autista e Acessibilidade Amorosa, Pessoa and Mendonça argue that living with autistic people shows that they often exhibit the need to choose people throughout their lives to play a supportive role. For some, it might be the husband or the wife. However, the spouse is not a caregiver or an 'extension' of the autistic person. The authors point out that the individual's psychoeducation is necessary for the awareness of his own sensations and feelings, so that he is able to deal with the consequences of the love relationship. For the writers, these interventions regarding self-awareness and social management are important at any moment in the subject's affective life.

In addition, the authors approximate Mendonça's experiences with those of the autistic character Benê, from the series Malhação and As Five. For example, in a certain chapter, she kisses a friend and is in doubt about the status of their relationship; if they were crushes, hookups or boyfriends, because I didn't see the possibility of a simple friendship encompassing a kiss like that. Pessoa and Mendonça observe that the autistic person has a more concrete way of experiencing reality, while the feeling of love presents a more abstract character, difficult to define in words. Mendonça reports that in the beginning of relationships, many of which did not even come to fruition, she felt this confusion about what the status of that relationship would be. In addition, the authors consider that there are other factors relevant to the discussion about love and sexuality in autism, such as sensory sensitivities. So, they conclude that there are no ready-made formulas for love or loving accessibility, although this does not remove the responsibility of reflecting on possibilities for everyday encounters and more accessible relationships.

Reception 
Transtorno do Espectro Autista e Acessibilidade Amorosa appeared as a reference in other publications on representations of non-normative bodies in the media, including a scientific article on Walt Disney Company productions. Mendonça expanded her studies on affective and loving accessibility in a book adapted from her thesis, Metamorfoses (2023). The paper was also adapted for two episodes of the eighth season of the Mundo Autista YouTube channel.

References 

Works about autism
Essays